Alexei Sayle's Stuff is a British television comedy sketch show which ran on BBC2 for a total of 18 episodes over 3 series from 1988 to 1991.

Cast
Alexei Sayle's Stuff stars stand-up comedian Alexei Sayle, with a recurring cast including Angus Deayton, Mark Williams, Arabella Weir, Tony Millan, Jan Ravens, Owen Brenman, Harriet Thorpe, Felicity Montagu and Morwenna Banks.

Synopsis
Sketches are interspersed with Sayle's trademark angry stand-up monologues, delivered from increasingly odd locations. Sayle is seen traversing the country on a moped in a vague attempt to catalogue and comprehend all the "stuff" about him. The style of humour is often highly surreal and blunt. The bulk of the content was written by Sayle himself, with Andrew Marshall and David Renwick. Additional material was contributed by longtime collaborator David Stafford and comedian and promoter Huw David Thomas. Although Sayle's humour in the programme covers many bases, politics is always a favourite target: "Recently I had to get married, 'cos I got my girlfriend into trouble – got her involved in the civil war in Angola." Various episodes also feature sketches based around BBC2 presentation, including satirical continuity announcers and faux trailers.

At the beginning of series 2, in a sequence spoofing the creation of Disney's Mickey Mouse, a sketch reveals that Alexei Sayle is in fact a cartoon character. Viewers are shown a short extract from Sayle's very first animated appearance from fifty years previously, named "Steamboat Fatty" (spoofing Steamboat Willie, the first Mickey Mouse cartoon), as well as Mouseketeer-esque children dancing around wearing bald wigs. An edited version of this sketch became the title sequence for series 2.

Series 1's titles feature a handsome young man arriving at BBC Television Centre to the accompaniment of Dion's hit The Wanderer, with prosthetic make-up and padding being applied to change his appearance to that of Alexei Sayle, followed by a BBC receptionist uttering the phrase "Who is that fat bastard?" which was to become the show's catch-phrase. Series 3's title sequence is a pastiche of Zorro, the theme song being sung mariachi style ("This fat renegade / Carves a 'B' with his blade / A 'B' that stands for 'Bastard'.")

One episode in series 2 begins with a lengthy cold open of an initially straight scene from Juliet Bravo featuring actress Anna Carteret. Viewers are fooled into believing that the first few minutes of the programme are a Juliet Bravo episode, the illusion being broken only when one of her male colleagues appears not to "know what a woman is". Similar blending and bending of the boundaries of TV formats continues throughout the series.

Memorable sketches
 Social Workers – the first sketch, per se, of the series. Description of various atrocities from history, Vlad the Impaler, Herod's Massacre of the Innocents etc. followed by interrogative journalism of English Nanny state social workers as to why they failed to take action on these events.
 Beauty Miss – personal beauty products, as used by George Bernard Shaw and Berthold Brecht
 Oscar Wilde's "The Noble Art of Verbal Abuse" – for protection against Millwall fans
 An interview with "Sir Freddy Krueger," new head of the English National Opera
 Joan Alone – Joan of Arc plugging her autobiography, record, etc., during interrogation
 Unemployment and Teletext – twin scourges of the 1990s
 Issues – A treatise on Islamic politics with waitresses Samantha, Tina, and Babs
 Hooray for British Films – a satirical attack on the then dire state of the British film industry
 A brigade of cowardly firemen who each suffer crippling phobias, such as Claustrophobia and Pyrophobia, that undermines their roles as firemen by preventing them from tackling a house fire – much to the house owner's frustration.
 International Olympic Committee looking round a council house in London with a view to staging the games inside it
 A drinks party with Triffids
 Firemen get dainty new uniforms and prance around like fashion models while out on the job
 Santa Claus : Polar Czar – World at War-style expose of Father Christmas as murderous dictator.
 Investigative journalists try to get an impromptu interview with God (Sayle) after hearing from various people who have each suffered comical misfortunes. God is portrayed as a reclusive man who 'moves in mysterious ways' by flailing around ridiculously as he walks.
 A Few Moments With Lord William Rees-Mogg – in episode 2 of series 3, on seven occasions throughout the show a photograph of Rees-Mogg was displayed on screen while Herb Alpert's The Swinger from Seville (burlesque-style music with an audience clearly audible in the background) was played over the top. After the first time it was shown, the BBC2 voiceover (Angus Deayton) apologised and assured the viewers at home that it would not happen again. It was then immediately brought back to the screen.
 A man who was decapitated and had to have an artificial head attached, in a documentary called "Man or Chess Piece?".
 Word Association – A music video for Sayle's eponymous 1985 song in which a game of word association gradually reveals his dirty mind to an attractive psychiatrist against his will. Despite initially being horrified and confused by Sayle's words, the psychiatrist ultimately falls in love with him.
 A spoof news broadcast detailing how Margaret Thatcher uses the TARDIS from Doctor Who to go back in time and visit a Black Plague clinic, then goes forward to visit an NHS hospital in the future, which looks exactly the same. She is quoted as saying that people should stop worrying about the Daleks exterminating people and instead focus on the opportunities they bring to the electronics industry.
 Most episodes in Series 3 feature the recurring character "Monsieur Aubergine", a mime artist who is part Mr. Bean and part Marcel Marceau.

Home media releases

Three complete episodes were included in separate editions of BBC Video World, a fortnightly subscription-only service – primarily for expatriates – that delivered a three-hour selection of BBC programming on video tape:

 Vol. 1 No. 11 (Aug 1989) = Series 1, episode 2
 Vol. 1 No. 16 (Nov 1989) = Series 1, episode 6
 Vol. 1 No. 18 (Dec 1989) = Series 2, episode 2

A VHS video entitled The Best of Alexei Sayle's Stuff was released by the BBC in 1990 featuring selected clips from the first two series.

Series 1 was released on Region 2 DVD by 2entertain in 2005. Series 2 and Series 3 were both released on Region-2 DVDs by the same firm in 2006. Each release was a single-disc edition containing the complete series, and no extra content. Only Series 2 was released on Region 4 DVD. As is common practice, certain sketches were omitted or truncated on the DVD releases, likely due to music licensing rights, or copyright issues. This included the removal of all of the linked "Michelin Film Awards" sketches from Series 2#2, which were complete on the BBC Video World release.

Legacy
Alexei Sayle's Stuff was a critical success and a prelude to his 1994 series The All New Alexei Sayle Show, which was broadly similar in content and was likewise followed by Alexei Sayle's Merry-Go-Round in 1998.

Sources
Johnson RK, British TV Show Reviews
"UK Comedy" on Memorable TV

External links

BBC television sketch shows
1980s British television sketch shows
1990s British television sketch shows
1988 British television series debuts
1991 British television series endings
English-language television shows